Nadia Ramassamy (born 17 May 1961) is a French politician from Réunion. She was elected the MP for Réunion's 6th constituency since 2017.

Career 
Aside being a politician, she continues to practice medicine, especially during the COVID-19 pandemic.

She lost her seat in the 2022 French legislative election.

References 

Living people
1961 births
21st-century French politicians
21st-century French women politicians
People from Saint-Denis, Réunion
Black French politicians
French nurses
French women nurses
Women members of the National Assembly (France)
Deputies of the 15th National Assembly of the French Fifth Republic
French politicians of Indian descent
Women from Réunion in politics
The Republicans (France) politicians
Members of Parliament for Réunion